Feng Boyuan (born 18 January 1995 in Nanjing) is a Chinese football player who currently plays as a forward for Kunshan.

Club career
Feng Boyuan started his professional football career in 2016 when he was promoted to Liaoning FC's first squad. He made his senior debut and scored his first goal on 11 May 2016 in a 3–1 win against Chengdu Qbao in the 2016 Chinese FA Cup. On 21 May 2016, he made his Super League debut in a 3–0 home loss against Guangzhou Evergrande. On 31 August 2017, Feng was loaned to Croatian First Football League side NK Rudeš. He made his league debut in a 1–0 win to NK Istra. On 11 October 2017, he scored a hat-trick in a 10–0 win against NK Mladost Buzin in the Zagreb's Cup. Feng returned to Liaoning who were newly relegated to the China League One for the 2018 season. On 10 March 2018, he scored his first league goal in a 2–0 home win over Xinjiang Tianshan Leopard. On 12 April 2018, he was handed a 5-match suspension by the CFA for abusing the fans during a league match against Qingdao Huanghai.

On 15 February 2019, Feng transferred to Super League side Jiangsu Suning, signing a four-year contract. He would go on to make his debut in a league game on 9 March 2019 against Shanghai SIPG in a 3-2 defeat. Utilized as a squad player he was part of the team that won the 2020 Chinese Super League title. Unfortunately the clubs parent company Suning Holdings Group were in financial difficulties and dissolved the team on 28 February 2021. On 9 April 2021 he would be free to join second tier club Kunshan. He would go on to make his debut in a league game on 25 April 2021 against Beijing BSU in a game that ended in a 2-2 draw. This would be followed by his first goal for the club in a league game on 15 May 2021 against Jiangxi Beidamen in a 6-0 victory. He would go on to establish himself as regular within the team and was part of the squad that won the division and promotion to the top tier at the end of the 2022 China League One campaign.

Career statistics
Statistics accurate as of match played 25 December 2022.

Honours

Club
Jiangsu Suning
Chinese Super League: 2020

Kunshan
 China League One: 2022

References

External links
 

1995 births
Living people
Sportspeople from Nanjing
Chinese footballers
Footballers from Jiangsu
Chinese expatriate footballers
Expatriate footballers in Croatia
Liaoning F.C. players
NK Rudeš players
Jiangsu F.C. players
Chinese Super League players
China League One players
Croatian Football League players
Association football forwards
Footballers at the 2018 Asian Games
Asian Games competitors for China